Kenneth 'Kenny' Jenkins (28 February 1945 – 13 November 2009) was a Scottish footballer who played in attack and defence. Jenkins played for Johnstone Burgh, Albion Rovers, Dumbarton and APIA Leichhardt Tigers.

References

External links
 

1945 births
2009 deaths
Albion Rovers F.C. players
Dumbarton F.C. players
Scottish Football League players
Johnstone Burgh F.C. players
Footballers from Glasgow
Scottish footballers
Scottish expatriate footballers
Expatriate soccer players in Australia
Association football forwards
Scottish Junior Football Association players